The 1996 NASCAR Winston Cup Series was the 48th season of professional stock car racing in the United States and the 25th modern-era NASCAR Cup series. The season had been started on February 18 at Daytona International Speedway, and ended on November 10 at Atlanta Motor Speedway. The season would be remembered for Terry Labonte pulling off a massive upset and winning his second Winston Cup Championship over teammate Jeff Gordon.

Pontiac’s struggles in 1995 carried over to 1996, scoring just one win in the Dura Lube 500 with Bobby Hamilton. Hamilton was also the only Pontiac driver to finish in the top ten in points standings, placing ninth.

Teams and drivers

Complete schedule

Limited schedule

Schedule

Races

Busch Clash 
The Busch Clash is the exhibition race that honors the drivers who won a pole in the NASCAR Winston Cup Series the previous year. Dale Jarrett won his first Busch Clash. Rick Mast won the random draw for the pole.

Top ten results

 88-Dale Jarrett
 4-Sterling Marlin
 3-Dale Earnhardt
 5-Terry Labonte
 25-Ken Schrader
 10-Ricky Rudd
 6-Mark Martin
 94-Bill Elliott
 24-Jeff Gordon
 16-Ted Musgrave

Gatorade Twin 125s 

The Gatorade Twin 125s, qualifying races for the Daytona 500, were held on February 15.

Race one top ten results 

 3-Dale Earnhardt
 4-Sterling Marlin
 5-Terry Labonte
 88-Dale Jarrett
 15-Wally Dallenbach Jr.
 21-Michael Waltrip
 22-Ward Burton
 6-Mark Martin
 90-Mike Wallace
 23-Jimmy Spencer

Marlin passed Earnhardt on the opening lap but Earnhardt repassed and led the last 22 laps.
Bobby Labonte flipped over on the backstretch after being tagged by Brett Bodine.

Race two top ten results

 28-Ernie Irvan
 25-Ken Schrader
 37-John Andretti
 24-Jeff Gordon
 10-Ricky Rudd
 75-Morgan Shepherd
 98-Jeremy Mayfield
 99-Jeff Burton
 27-Elton Sawyer
 16-Ted Musgrave

Irvan led wire-to-wire with Schrader alongside in the final lap.

Daytona 500 

Top ten results:
 88-Dale Jarrett
 3-Dale Earnhardt
 25-Ken Schrader
 6-Mark Martin
 99-Jeff Burton
 15-Wally Dallenbach Jr.
 16-Ted Musgrave
  94-Bill Elliott
 10-Ricky Rudd
 21-Michael Waltrip

This was Dale Jarrett's second career Daytona 500 victory. He also won the 1996 Busch Clash. Both of those victories saw Dale Earnhardt finish second to Jarrett.
When the white flag was displayed, play-by-play analyst Ken Squier gave the privileges to color analyst Ned Jarrett so he can call the final lap solo and lead his son on to the victory, as he did in 1993.

Goodwrench Service 400 

The Goodwrench Service 400 was held on February 25 at North Carolina Speedway. The #5 of Terry Labonte won the pole.

Top ten results

 3-Dale Earnhardt
 88-Dale Jarrett
 41-Ricky Craven
 10-Ricky Rudd
 29-Steve Grissom
 4-Sterling Marlin
 81-Kenny Wallace
 12-Derrike Cope, 1 lap down
 87-Joe Nemechek, 1 lap down
 1-Rick Mast, 2 laps down

On lap 343 Earnhardt and Bobby Hamilton had traded the lead three times in the previous three laps when Earnhardt punted Hamilton in Turn Four; Hamilton scraped the wall and later crashed because of damage from the earlier scrape.
Failed to qualify: 27-Elton Sawyer, 78-Randy MacDonald, 93-Gary Bradberry, 63-Dick Trickle

Pontiac Excitement 400 

The Pontiac Excitement 400 was run on March 3 at Richmond International Raceway. Terry Labonte won the pole.

Top ten results

 24-Jeff Gordon
 88-Dale Jarrett
 16-Ted Musgrave
 99-Jeff Burton
 6-Mark Martin
 43-Bobby Hamilton
 2-Rusty Wallace
 5-Terry Labonte
 10-Ricky Rudd
 94-Bill Elliott

Failed to qualify: 78-Randy MacDonald, 02-Robbie Faggart, 19-Dick Trickle
Coming into this race, Terry Labonte had led the most laps at Daytona and Rockingham but was 30th in the points standings, while Jeff Gordon was 43rd. After this race they were 17th and 27th, respectively.

Purolator 500 

The Purolator 500 was run on March 10 at Atlanta Motor Speedway. The No. 30 of Johnny Benson won the pole, but crashed in Happy Hour, forcing him to a backup car (and to the back of the field for the start).

Top ten results

 3-Dale Earnhardt
 5-Terry Labonte
 24-Jeff Gordon
 28-Ernie Irvan
 98-Jeremy Mayfield
 25-Ken Schrader
 23-Jimmy Spencer, 1 lap down
 10-Ricky Rudd, 1 lap down
 21-Michael Waltrip, 1 lap down
 94-Bill Elliott, 1 lap down

Failed to qualify: 65-Steve Seligman, 78-Randy MacDonald, 99-Jeff Burton
Jeff Burton failing to qualify sparked a lot of controversy, as he was 2nd in the points standings going into this race. Provisionals for the first 4 races defaulted from 1995 driver and owner points, and he missed the field due to the 99 car being a new team. As a result, he fell from 2nd to 14th in the standings and never found his way back into the top 10 in points the rest of the season. 
This race would be the last victory for Dale Earnhardt until the 1998 Daytona 500.

TranSouth Financial 400 

The TranSouth Financial 400 was run on March 24 at Darlington Raceway. Ward Burton won the pole.

Top ten results

 24-Jeff Gordon
 18-Bobby Labonte
 41-Ricky Craven
 2-Rusty Wallace
 5-Terry Labonte
 6-Mark Martin
 16-Ted Musgrave
 75-Morgan Shepherd, 1 lap down
 10-Ricky Rudd, 1 lap down
 99-Jeff Burton, 1 lap down

Failed to qualify: 95-Chuck Bown, 78-Randy MacDonald, 02-Robbie Faggart, 32-Jimmy Hensley

Food City 500 

The Food City 500 was run on March 31 at Bristol International Raceway. Mark Martin won the pole. The race was shortened to 342 laps due to rain.

Top ten results

 24-Jeff Gordon
 5-Terry Labonte
 6-Mark Martin
 3-Dale Earnhardt
 2-Rusty Wallace
 88-Dale Jarrett
 18-Bobby Labonte, 1 lap down
 19-Dick Trickle, 1 lap down
 41-Ricky Craven, 1 lap down
 21-Michael Waltrip, 2 laps down

Failed to qualify: 90-Mike Wallace, 37-John Andretti, 30-Johnny Benson, 71-Dave Marcis, 77-Bobby Hillin Jr., 95-Chuck Bown
There were 3 red flags during the race. Prior to the first red flag, Bill Elliott crashed on lap 321 prior to the caution for rain. After the race resumed following a 1-hour rain delay, Darrell Waltrip crashed and spilled fuel, which caused another stoppage on lap 335. Moments after the race resumed, more rain came down. With dusk settling in, the rain continued and the race was stopped.
Final race at this track under the name Bristol International Raceway.

First Union 400 

The First Union 400 was run on April 14 at North Wilkesboro Speedway. Terry Labonte won the pole.

Top ten results

 5-Terry Labonte
 24-Jeff Gordon
 3-Dale Earnhardt
 33-Robert Pressley
 4-Sterling Marlin
 28-Ernie Irvan, 1 lap down
 41-Ricky Craven, 1 lap down
 43-Bobby Hamilton, 2 laps down
 25-Ken Schrader, 2 laps down
 18-Bobby Labonte, 2 laps down

Failed to qualify: 71-Dave Marcis, 78-Randy MacDonald, 90-Mike Wallace, 22-Ward Burton, 77-Bobby Hillin Jr.
This was the first race run at North Wilkesboro following the passing of track president Enoch Staley, which threw the track's NASCAR future into doubt.
Terry Labonte tied Richard Petty's record streak of 513 consecutive Winston Cup Series starts. Labonte's car carried a special silver "Ironman" paint scheme for this race and the following weekend at Martinsville.

Goody's Headache Powder 500 

The Goody's Headache Powder 500 was run on April 21 at Martinsville Speedway. The #41 of Ricky Craven won the pole.

Top ten results

 2-Rusty Wallace
 28-Ernie Irvan
 24-Jeff Gordon
 98-Jeremy Mayfield
 3-Dale Earnhardt
 43-Bobby Hamilton, 1 lap down
 25-Ken Schrader, 2 laps down
 18-Bobby Labonte, 2 laps down
 16-Ted Musgrave, 2 laps down
 4-Sterling Marlin, 2 laps down

Failed to qualify: 78-Randy MacDonald, 27-Elton Sawyer, 29-Steve Grissom, 19-Dick Trickle, 77-Bobby Hillin Jr., 15-Wally Dallenbach Jr., 22-Ward Burton
Terry Labonte, by starting this race, broke the record for most consecutive starts with his 514th consecutive start.  The previous record, 513, was held by Richard Petty.  A special "Iron Man" paint scheme was used to commemorate this feat.

Winston Select 500 

The Winston Select 500 was run on April 28 at Talladega Superspeedway. Ernie Irvan won the pole.

Top 10 results

 4-Sterling Marlin
 88-Dale Jarrett
 3-Dale Earnhardt
 5-Terry Labonte
 21-Michael Waltrip
 29-Steve Grissom
 33-Robert Pressley
 16-Ted Musgrave
 37-John Andretti
 30-Johnny Benson

Failed to qualify: 73-Phil Barkdoll, 65-Steve Seligman, 77-Bobby Hillin Jr., 0-Delma Cowart, 97-Chad Little
Controversy developed before the race; after winning the pole, Ernie Irvan's Ford was taken to a flatbed-mounted chassis dynamometer and "driven" by Gary Nelson to check horsepower; the engine was over-revved and subsequently damaged beyond repair.  Sterling Marlin's Chevrolet was supposed to be tested as well but the chassis dyno failed to produce a horsepower figure and the test was scrapped.  Several reporters in the garage area questioned Nelson on the test and crew chief Larry McReynolds got into a heated dispute with Nelson over the test.  Irvan struggled in the race and reacted after the Ricky Craven crash where he was buried in midpack, "It's all a result of what happened on Friday when (NASCAR) blew our motor up."
Two major accidents marred the race: Bill Elliott suffered a broken femur after going airborne and landing driver side-first in a single-car crash on lap 77. Then, "The Big One" hit on lap 130, collecting 14 cars and sending the #41 of Ricky Craven flying into the catch fence and nearly over it. The race was red-flagged for clean-up on lap 131 because Craven's car had completely destroyed the catch fence in turn two. Bob Jenkins, ESPN's lap-by-lap announcer, was so shocked by the crash that he said "Oh shit!" over the raw satellite feed when Craven's car was flipping. Craven sustained compression fractures in his back and a concussion, injuries that derailed what had been a successful 1996 campaign. Fourth in points going into the race, Craven fell to twentieth by season’s end.

Sterling Marlin won by passing the entire field on three separate occasions after pit stops.

Save Mart Supermarkets 300 

The Save Mart Supermarkets 300 was run on May 5 at Sears Point Raceway. Terry Labonte won the pole.

Top ten results

 2-Rusty Wallace
 6-Mark Martin
 15-Wally Dallenbach Jr.
 3-Dale Earnhardt
 5-Terry Labonte
 24-Jeff Gordon
 10-Ricky Rudd
 25-Ken Schrader
 18-Bobby Labonte
 22-Ward Burton

Failed to qualify: 07-Geoff Bodine, 45-Chad Little, 20-Mark Krogh, 03-Joe Bean, 58-Wayne Jacks, 02-Bill McAnally, 07W-Lance Hooper (Note: Bodine replaced Dave Rezendes in the No. 7 in the race)

Tommy Kendall and Ron Hornaday Jr. served as relief drivers for Bill Elliott and Ricky Craven respectively for this race.

The Winston Select 

The Winston is the 2nd exhibition race run each year at Charlotte Motor Speedway. Jimmy Spencer won the Winston Select Open, while Lake Speed, Hut Stricklin, Jeff Burton and Michael Waltrip transferred into the race by finishing in the top 5. Jeff Gordon won the pole.

Top ten results

 21-Michael Waltrip
 2-Rusty Wallace
 3-Dale Earnhardt
 6-Mark Martin
 5-Terry Labonte
 10-Ricky Rudd
 28-Ernie Irvan
 24-Jeff Gordon
 88-Dale Jarrett
 4-Sterling Marlin

Harry Gant came out of retirement for this race to sub for Bill Elliott who was recovering from the injuries he suffered at Talladega in April.

Coca-Cola 600 

The Coca-Cola 600 was run on May 26 at Charlotte Motor Speedway. Jeff Gordon won the pole.

Top ten results

 88-Dale Jarrett
 3-Dale Earnhardt
 5-Terry Labonte
 24-Jeff Gordon
 25-Ken Schrader, 1 lap down
 4-Sterling Marlin, 1 lap down
 6-Mark Martin, 1 lap down
 21-Michael Waltrip, 1 lap down
 28-Ernie Irvan, 2 laps down
 7-Geoff Bodine, 2 laps down

Failed to qualify: 78-Randy MacDonald, 63-Ed Berrier, 26-Hermie Sadler, 49-Mark Gibson, 02-Robbie Faggart, 0-Delma Cowart, 57-Steve Seligman

Johnny Benson was knocked unconscious briefly when his Pontiac hit the turn two wall then slid into the path of Ricky Craven, who blasted through the rear deck of his car at full speed.

Miller 500 (Dover) 

The Miller 500 was run on June 2 at Dover Downs International Speedway. Jeff Gordon won the pole.

Top ten results

 24-Jeff Gordon
 5-Terry Labonte
 3-Dale Earnhardt
 28-Ernie Irvan
 18-Bobby Labonte, 1 lap down
 23-Jimmy Spencer, 1 lap down
 2-Rusty Wallace, 1 lap down
 10-Ricky Rudd, 1 lap down
 99-Jeff Burton, 1 lap down
 25-Ken Schrader, 1 lap down

 No DNQ

UAW-GM Teamwork 500 

The UAW-GM Teamwork 500 was run on June 16 at Pocono Raceway. Jeff Gordon won the pole.

Top ten results

 24-Jeff Gordon
 10-Ricky Rudd
 7-Geoff Bodine
 6-Mark Martin
 43-Bobby Hamilton
 75-Morgan Shepherd
 5-Terry Labonte
 23-Jimmy Spencer
 99-Jeff Burton
 94-Todd Bodine*

Failed to qualify: 71-Dave Marcis

 Todd Bodine was subbing for Bill Elliott, who was still recovering from his broken femur at Talladega.
 It was the first race at Pocono since the track was repaved; the lead changed two to three times a lap on some ten separate laps during the race's first half, primarily between Gordon, Hut Stricklin, and Derrike Cope.

Miller 400 (Michigan) 

The Miller 400 was run on June 23 at Michigan Speedway. The #43 of Bobby Hamilton won the pole.

Top ten results

 2-Rusty Wallace
 5-Terry Labonte
 4-Sterling Marlin
 23-Jimmy Spencer
 28-Ernie Irvan
 24-Jeff Gordon
 6-Mark Martin
 16-Ted Musgrave
 3-Dale Earnhardt
 88-Dale Jarrett

 No DNQ

Pepsi 400 

The Pepsi 400 was run on July 6 at Daytona International Speedway. Jeff Gordon started on the pole. The race was shortened to 117 laps due to rain.

Top ten results

 4-Sterling Marlin
 5-Terry Labonte
 24-Jeff Gordon
 3-Dale Earnhardt
 28-Ernie Irvan
 88-Dale Jarrett
 21-Michael Waltrip
 25-Ken Schrader
 11-Brett Bodine
 23-Jimmy Spencer

Failed to qualify: 57-Steve Seligman

Bill Elliott returned in this race from his broken femur suffered back at Talladega.
Morning rain delayed the start for 3 hours. After only 117 of 160 laps, the race was red-flagged and ended for rain once again.

Jiffy Lube 300 

The Jiffy Lube 300 was run on July 14 at New Hampshire International Speedway. The #41 of Ricky Craven won the pole.

Top ten results

 28-Ernie Irvan
 88-Dale Jarrett
 10-Ricky Rudd
 99-Jeff Burton
 33-Robert Pressley
 5-Terry Labonte
 2-Rusty Wallace
 25-Ken Schrader
 30-Johnny Benson
 21-Michael Waltrip

 Failed to qualify: 19-Loy Allen Jr.
 This was Ernie Irvan's 1st victory since his comeback from his near-fatal injuries at Michigan in 1994.

Miller 500 (Pocono) 

The Miller 500 was run on July 21 at Pocono Raceway. Mark Martin won the pole.

Top ten results

 2-Rusty Wallace
 10-Ricky Rudd
 88-Dale Jarrett
 28-Ernie Irvan
 30-Johnny Benson
 4-Sterling Marlin
 24-Jeff Gordon
 9-Lake Speed
 6-Mark Martin
 12-Derrike Cope

 No DNQ

DieHard 500 

The DieHard 500 was run on July 28 at Talladega Superspeedway. The #98 of Jeremy Mayfield won the pole. The race was shortened to 129 laps due to darkness.

Top ten results

 24-Jeff Gordon
 88-Dale Jarrett
 6-Mark Martin
 28-Ernie Irvan
 23-Jimmy Spencer
 7-Geoff Bodine
 99-Jeff Burton
 18-Bobby Labonte
 17-Darrell Waltrip
 2-Rusty Wallace

Failed to qualify: 97-Chad Little

 The race started late due to rain delays, and was marred by "The Big One" on lap 117 that injured Dale Earnhardt after he, Ernie Irvan and Sterling Marlin got together, sending Earnhardt and Marlin head-on into the tri-oval wall at approximately 200 miles per hour. Earnhardt flipped onto his roof and collected 11 other cars. Earnhardt took a hit to the roof from Robert Pressley's #33 and another big hit from Derrike Cope's #12. Earnhardt suffered a broken collarbone and sternum in the crash. Marlin suffered several contusions from the hard impact. Due to darkness caused by the rain delay and red flag, the race was shortened to 129 laps.
 CBS moved away from its live coverage of the race during the rain delay in order to show the final round of the Senior PGA Tour Ameritech Senior Open. The race aired flag to flag on tape delay the following week (August 4). This is the most recent time a NASCAR points race was  televised on tape delay.
The final time that Talladega's second race was run in July, which was run since the inaugural running. For the 1997 schedule, the race was moved to October where temperatures would be cooler and the weather more suitable. Today, the race remains in the October slot on the schedule.

Brickyard 400 

The Brickyard 400 was run on August 3 at Indianapolis Motor Speedway. The #24 of Jeff Gordon won the pole.

Top ten results

 88-Dale Jarrett
 28-Ernie Irvan
 5-Terry Labonte
 6-Mark Martin
 75-Morgan Shepherd
 10-Ricky Rudd
 2-Rusty Wallace
 30-Johnny Benson
 1-Rick Mast
 94-Bill Elliott

Failed to qualify: 91-Ron Barfield Jr., 27-Jason Keller, 78-Randy MacDonald, 46-Stacy Compton, 02-Robbie Faggart, 50-A. J. Foyt, 57-Steve Seligman, 44-Jeff Purvis, 19-Loy Allen Jr., 49-Erik Smith, 63-Mike Wallace

 Jarrett took the lead for good when he passed his teammate Irvan in the south chute with 7 laps to go. The race ended under caution when Robert Pressley crashed in turn 4 with 2 laps left.
 Dale Earnhardt had to be relieved by Mike Skinner as a result of the injuries Earnhardt suffered the previous week at Talladega. Skinner took over the car during the first caution and drove the car to a 15th place finish.
 A violent crash occurred on lap 38 when Kyle Petty blew his right front tire and hit the turn 4 wall. Petty drifted into the path of Sterling Marlin, who hit Petty on the driver's side. Petty's car bounced into the wall again, just in front of Mark Martin who barely managed to get by, then sped across the track and hard into the inside barrier. Petty escaped with minor injuries.
 During the weekend, a fight erupted in the garage area between Ernie Irvan and Sterling Marlin and some crewmen from Morgan-McClure Motorsports over the crash at Talladega the previous weekend.  Some of Marlin's crew had posted signs in the garage area deriding Irvan and mocking his eyesight.

The Bud at The Glen 

The Bud at The Glen was run on August 11 at Watkins Glen International. Dale Earnhardt won the pole with a new track record of 120.733 mph while driving with the injuries suffered 2 weeks earlier. When asked what he thought of the lap, he was quoted as saying "It hurt so good." 1994 NASCAR Busch Series Champion David Green was standing by to relieve Earnhardt during the race, but Earnhardt decided to drive the full race eventually finishing 6th.

Top ten results

 7-Geoff Bodine
 5-Terry Labonte
 6-Mark Martin
 24-Jeff Gordon
 18-Bobby Labonte
 3-Dale Earnhardt
 21-Michael Waltrip
 87-Joe Nemechek
 75-Morgan Shepherd
 15-Wally Dallenbach Jr.

Failed to qualify: 34-Mike McLaughlin

 Geoff Bodine from nearby Chemung broke a 55-race winless streak, dating back to October 2 in the 1994 Tyson Holly Farms 400. It was an emotional and very popular victory for Bodine, following a 2-year struggle with his competitiveness and his personal life.
 This was the last win for Geoff Bodine.
 This was the last pole position for Dale Earnhardt.
 Geoff Bodine had won by short pitting - stopping before he needed fuel and tires so that he could stay out and improve track position when everyone else went to the pits.
As of 2022, this is the last time that car number 7 went to victory lane.

GM Goodwrench Dealer 400 

The GM Goodwrench Dealer 400 was run on August 18 at Michigan Speedway. Jeff Burton won the pole.

Top ten results

 88-Dale Jarrett
 6-Mark Martin
 5-Terry Labonte
 28-Ernie Irvan
 24-Jeff Gordon
 18-Bobby Labonte
 30-Johnny Benson
 10-Ricky Rudd
 99-Jeff Burton
 23-Jimmy Spencer

Failed to qualify: 14-Ron Hornaday Jr., 27-Elton Sawyer

Goody's Headache Powder 500 (Bristol) 

The Goody's Headache Powder 500 was run on August 24 at Bristol Motor Speedway. Mark Martin won the pole.

Top ten results

 2-Rusty Wallace
 24-Jeff Gordon
 6-Mark Martin
 88-Dale Jarrett
 5-Terry Labonte
 21-Michael Waltrip
 23-Jimmy Spencer
 22-Ward Burton
 10-Ricky Rudd
 43-Bobby Hamilton

Failed to qualify: 77-Bobby Hillin Jr.

Mountain Dew Southern 500 

The Mountain Dew Southern 500 was run on September 1 at Darlington Raceway. Dale Jarrett won the pole and had the chance to win the Winston Million if he won the race.  Jarrett lost his chance at the bonus after hitting oil early in the race.

Top ten results

 24-Jeff Gordon
 8-Hut Stricklin
 6-Mark Martin
 25-Ken Schrader, 1 lap down
 37-John Andretti, 1 lap down
 18-Bobby Labonte, 1 lap down
 28-Ernie Irvan, 1 lap down
 4-Sterling Marlin, 1 lap down
 94-Bill Elliott, 1 lap down
 9-Lake Speed, 1 lap down

Failed to qualify: 78-Randy MacDonald, 87-Joe Nemechek, 40-Jay Sauter, 02-Robbie Faggart
 Hut Stricklin led the most laps in the race and was in position for his first career Winston Cup victory in his 217th start, but Jeff Gordon started to reel him in. After a long battle, Gordon passed Stricklin for the lead on the backstretch on lap 353 and proceeded to win by over 5 seconds.

Miller 400 (Richmond) 

The Miller 400 was run on September 7 at Richmond International Raceway. Mark Martin won the pole.

Top ten results

 28-Ernie Irvan
 24-Jeff Gordon
 99-Jeff Burton
 88-Dale Jarrett
 5-Terry Labonte
 2-Rusty Wallace
 43-Bobby Hamilton
 12-Derrike Cope
 6-Mark Martin
 30-Johnny Benson

Failed to qualify: 46-Stacy Compton, 40-Jay Sauter, 95-Gary Bradberry

 A driver change happened during the week after Darlington. Kranefuss-Haas Racing's No. 37 and Cale Yarborough Motorsports' No. 98 switched drivers. So John Andretti moved to the No. 98 and Jeremy Mayfield moved to the No. 37.

MBNA 500 

The MBNA 500 was run on September 15 at Dover Downs International Speedway. Bobby Labonte won the pole.

Top ten results

 24-Jeff Gordon
 2-Rusty Wallace
 88-Dale Jarrett
 18-Bobby Labonte
 6-Mark Martin
 1-Rick Mast
 22-Ward Burton
 42-Kyle Petty
 21-Michael Waltrip
 43-Bobby Hamilton

Failed to qualify: 49-Eric Smith

 On lap 456, a wreck involving the #23 of Jimmy Spencer, the #16 of Ted Musgrave, the #11 of Brett Bodine and the #15 of Wally Dallenbach Jr. occurred on the front straight. Spencer blamed Dallenbach for the wreck, and after the cars rolled to a stop, Spencer got out of his car, ran over to Dallenbach's, and tried to punch Wally through the window net. Spencer had to be restrained by a Winston Cup official.

 Another fight occurred in the garage area when Derrike Cope crashed and was assaulted by crew chief Larry McReynolds over an earlier wreck that eliminated Ernie Irvan.

 As the cars stopped on pit road after the race a third fight occurred as Kyle Petty and Michael Waltrip got into an argument.

Hanes 500 

The Hanes 500 was run on September 22 at Martinsville Speedway. Bobby Hamilton won the pole.

Top ten results

 24-Jeff Gordon
 5-Terry Labonte
 43-Bobby Hamilton
 1-Rick Mast
 98-John Andretti
 75-Morgan Shepherd
 7-Geoff Bodine
 42-Kyle Petty
 6-Mark Martin, 1 lap down
 81-Kenny Wallace, 1 lap down

Failed to qualify: 12-Derrike Cope, 11-Brett Bodine, 29-Chad Little, 22-Ward Burton, 78-Billy Standridge, 95-Gary Bradberry

This is the fastest Martinsville race in NASCAR history, with an average speed of 82.223 mph.

Tyson Holly Farms 400 

The Tyson Holly Farms 400 was run on September 29 at North Wilkesboro Speedway. Ted Musgrave won the pole.

Top ten results

 24-Jeff Gordon
 3-Dale Earnhardt
 88-Dale Jarrett
 99-Jeff Burton
 5-Terry Labonte
 1-Rick Mast
 10-Ricky Rudd
 43-Bobby Hamilton
 6-Mark Martin
 2-Rusty Wallace

Failed to qualify: 22-Ward Burton, 90-Dick Trickle, 95-Gary Bradberry

This was the final NASCAR race at North Wilkesboro Speedway until 2023, which closed down after the race. It was the only track other than Martinsville that NASCAR had been running at since NASCAR's first full season in 1949.
10th and final win of 1996 for Jeff Gordon.
Jeff Gordon became the 1st driver since Rusty Wallace in 1993 to score 10 victories in a single season.
 This was the final race until New Hampshire in September 2007 that had every car running at the finish.
 Only 37 cars started this race. It was the last Cup Series race in which fewer than 40 cars started until the 2016 Folds of Honor QuikTrip 500, the second race after NASCAR reduced field sizes in the Cup Series from 43 to 40. A total of 39 cars entered that race.

UAW-GM Quality 500 

The UAW-GM Quality 500 was run on October 6 at Charlotte Motor Speedway. The #18 of Bobby Labonte won the pole.

Top ten results

 5-Terry Labonte
 6-Mark Martin
 88-Dale Jarrett
 4-Sterling Marlin
 41-Ricky Craven
 3-Dale Earnhardt
 22-Ward Burton
 2-Rusty Wallace
 21-Michael Waltrip
 94-Bill Elliott

Ernie Irvan escaped serious injury in a savage melee when he spun in turn two, clipped Robby Gordon, then slid into the path of John Andretti, who annihilated the nose of Irvan's Ford while Gordon hit the inside concrete wall and dislodged it.
With Terry Labonte winning the race, and Jeff Gordon finishing 31st, Gordon went from a 111 point lead to a 1 point lead over Labonte.
Final time in his career that Terry Labonte won multiple races in a season.

Failed to qualify: 87-Joe Nemechek, 95-Gary Bradberry, 71-Dave Marcis, 02-Robbie Faggart, 0-Delma Cowart

AC Delco 400 

The AC Delco 400 was run on October 20 at North Carolina Motor Speedway. Dale Jarrett won the pole.

Top ten results

 10-Ricky Rudd
 88-Dale Jarrett
 5-Terry Labonte
 28-Ernie Irvan
 99-Jeff Burton
 18-Bobby Labonte
 6-Mark Martin
 2-Rusty Wallace
 3-Dale Earnhardt
 23-Jimmy Spencer

Failed to qualify: 60-Ed Berrier, 79-Norm Benning, 82-Terry Byers

Terry Labonte finished 3rd, and Jeff Gordon would finish 12th. Labonte gained 33 points on Gordon in this race. With that points gain, Labonte would become the new point leader by 32 points over Gordon, and he would hold on to the point lead for the rest of the season.

Dura Lube 500 

The Dura Lube 500 was run on October 27 at Phoenix International Raceway. Bobby Labonte won the pole.

Top ten results

 43-Bobby Hamilton
 6-Mark Martin
 5-Terry Labonte
 16-Ted Musgrave
 24-Jeff Gordon
 7-Geoff Bodine
 28-Ernie Irvan
 88-Dale Jarrett
 18-Bobby Labonte
 17-Darrell Waltrip

Failed to qualify: 20-Mark Krogh, 00-Scott Gaylord, 35-Larry Gunselman, 38-Rich Woodland, 03-Joe Bean, 02-Bill McAnnally

 This was Bobby Hamilton's first career Winston Cup Series win, and the first for the Petty Enterprises team since 1983 (it was the first for the No. 43 car since 1984 when Richard Petty won driving for Mike Curb).

NAPA 500 

The NAPA 500 was run on November 10 at Atlanta Motor Speedway. Bobby Labonte won the pole.

Top ten results

 18-Bobby Labonte
 88-Dale Jarrett
 24-Jeff Gordon
 3-Dale Earnhardt
 5-Terry Labonte
 43-Bobby Hamilton
 6-Mark Martin
 10-Ricky Rudd
 99-Jeff Burton
 2-Rusty Wallace

Failed to qualify: 12-Derrike Cope, 37-Jeremy Mayfield, 90-Dick Trickle, 81-Kenny Wallace, 27-Ron Barfield Jr., 42-Kyle Petty

This race was most remembered by both of the Labonte brothers having reasons to celebrate. Bobby would win the race, and Terry would win the series championship, and together, both brothers would take a victory lap around the race track. As of 2022, this would be the only time in NASCAR history that in the season finale, one brother would win the race, and the other brother would win the championship.
This was Terry Labonte's second championship. His first one came 12 years earlier in 1984, making this the longest time span between 1st and 2nd championships for any driver in NASCAR history.
All 3 championship contenders (Terry Labonte, Jeff Gordon, and Dale Jarrett) started the race in the top 5 (Gordon 2nd, Labonte 3rd, and Jarrett 5th), and they all finished in the top 5 (Jarrett 2nd, Gordon 3rd, and Labonte 5th). Labonte won the title by 37 points over Gordon, and 89 points over Jarrett.
Terry Labonte's 2 wins gave him the championship over Jeff Gordon's 10 wins. Even though Gordon scored the most wins of 1996, he lacked consistency in the final stretch of the season. Labonte's consistency in the last 4 races of the season was better than Gordon's. Labonte won the title by 37 points. This would be the 3rd and final time in Bob Latford's Winston Cup points system that a driver winning 10 or more races in a season failed to win the championship due to lack of consistency. The 1st time was in 1985 when Bill Elliott won 11 races but lost the title to Darrell Waltrip, who had 3 wins, due to lack of consistency in the final stretch of the season. Waltrip won the title by 101 points. The 2nd time was in 1993 when Rusty Wallace won 10 races, but lost the title to Dale Earnhardt, who had 6 wins, also due to lack of consistency in the final stretch of the season. Earnhardt won the title by 80 points.
Terry Labonte would join the late Alan Kulwicki and win the championship by winning only 2 races in a season. Only Matt Kenseth, who won one race in 2003, has won fewer races while winning a championship. 
Ross Perot Jr. was the grand marshal for this race.
Bobby Labonte's victory was also the last victory for Joe Gibbs Racing fielding Chevrolets until 2003, as the following season would see the team switch to the Pontiac Grand Prix.

NASCAR Suzuka Thunder Special 

The NASCAR Suzuka Thunder Special was a non-points exhibition race ran on November 23 at Suzuka Circuit - East Circuit. Rusty Wallace won the pole. This was the first ever NASCAR race in Japan.

Top ten results

 2-Rusty Wallace
 3-Dale Earnhardt
 24-Jeff Gordon
 5-Terry Labonte
 15-Wally Dallenbach Jr.
 30-Johnny Benson
 77-Bobby Hillin Jr.
 31-Mike Skinner
 61-Rick Carelli
 38-Butch Gilliland

 NASCAR legend Elmo Langley was intended to drive the pace car for this race, but suffered a massive heart attack 2 days prior in the pace car when trying to get familiar with the course. Langley was 68 when he died in a nearby hospital.

Results and standings

Drivers' championship
(key) Bold – Pole position awarded by time. Italics – Pole position set by owner's points standings. * – Most laps led.

Owners' championship
(key) Bold - Pole position awarded by time. Italics - Pole position set by owner's points standings. * – Most laps led.

Rookie of the Year 

Johnny Benson was the only rookie to make a full-time run in the 1996 season, making him the 1996 Rookie of the Year. Benson ended the year with one top 5, six top 10s, and one pole. Randy MacDonald and Stacy Compton made attempts at the award as well, but did not run enough times to catch Benson.

See also
1996 NASCAR Busch Series
1996 NASCAR Craftsman Truck Series

References

External links
 Winston Cup Standings and Statistics for 1996

 
NASCAR Cup Series seasons